The 1951–52 season was the 4th season of competitive football in Israel and the 26th season under the Israeli Football Association, established in 1928, during the British Mandate.

Review and Events
 In September 1951, Hapoel Tel Aviv conducted a tour of England, playing against Arsenal (losing 1–6), Manchester United (losing 0–6) and Leeds United (losing 0–2).
 In April 1952, Maccabi Tel Aviv departed on a tour of Turkey. Maccabi played Hacettepe, winning 1–0, Ankara Demirspor, winning 3–0, Ankaragücü, losing 2–3, Gençlerbirliği, losing 0–2 and Fenerbahçe, drawing 1–1.
 On 30 April 1952, Independence Day, the annual Jerusalem Cup was contested for the second time. The teams competing for the cup were selected XI from different cities. In the cup semi-finals, played on 19 April 1952, Jerusalem XI had beaten Haifa XI 4–3 and Petah Tikva XI defeated Ramat Gan XI 3–1. In the final, played at YMCA Stadium in Jerusalem, Petah Tikva XI won 5–0.
 In May 1952 work began on Kiryat Haim Stadium.

IFA Competitions

League competitions

1951–52 Israel State Cup 

The competition took place between 24 November 1951 and 7 June 1952. Maccabi Petah Tikva beaten Maccabi Tel Aviv 1–0 in the final.

National Teams

National team
No matches were played by the national team during the season.

Notes

References

   
Seasons in Israeli football